Bolívar Municipality may refer to:

Bolivia
 Bolívar Municipality, Cochabamba

Venezuela
Bolívar Municipality, Aragua
Bolívar Municipality, Barinas
Bolívar Municipality, Falcón
Bolívar Municipality, Monagas
Bolívar Municipality, Sucre
Bolívar Municipality, Táchira
Bolívar Municipality, Trujillo
Bolívar Municipality, Yaracuy

See also
Simón Bolívar Municipality (disambiguation)

Municipality name disambiguation pages